Providence Township is one of sixteen townships in Buena Vista County, Iowa, USA.  As of the 2000 census, its population was 316.

Geography

References

External links
 US-Counties.com
 City-Data.com

Townships in Buena Vista County, Iowa
Townships in Iowa